is a Japanese original short anime television series about ASMR co-animated by Ekachi Epilka and Indivision and directed by Yoshinobu Kasai, with character designs provided by Takayuki Noguchi. The series aired from October to December 2021 on Tokyo MX. The anime's theme song is "Chuchoter" by Ayumi.

Characters

Episode list

References

External links
Anime official website 

Anime with original screenplays
Autonomous sensory meridian response
Ekachi Epilka
Tokyo MX original programming